The separation of military and police roles is the principle by which the military and law enforcement perform clearly differentiated duties and do not interfere with each other's areas of discipline. Whereas the military's purpose is to fight wars, law enforcement is meant to enforce domestic law. Neither is trained specifically to do the other's job. Military and law enforcement differ, sometimes fundamentally, in areas such as source of authority, training in use of force, training in investigation and prosecution, and training in enforcing laws and ensuring civil liberties.

Even "gray area" threats like drug trafficking, organized crime or terrorism will require sophisticated investigative skills and adherence to procedures for building a case as well as close collaboration with prosecutorial and judicial authorities. These are arguably traits solely attributed to law enforcement officers. Military personnel, on the other hand, are trained to defend the national territory from foreign military threats and are equipped with weapons designed to kill the enemy, rather than to stun or disable. The presence of a heavily-armed military standing in for the law enforcement personnel may reassure anxious civilians or not, but it should at best be partial and short-term.

In the United States 
In the United States, the 1878 Posse Comitatus Act place limits (but does not absolutely forbid) on the federal government in dispatching federal military personnel and federalized National Guard forces to enforce domestic policies.

There are instances of the military being called into action (such as during national emergencies caused by natural disasters or civil disorders) and efficiently saving lives and restoring order, such as the 1992 Los Angeles riots and Hurricane Katrina. On the other hand, there have also been instances where the use of military in a domestic role has gone wrong, such as the Kent State shootings.

In the 1980s, Congress began discussing a broader military role, but Ronald Reagan's Secretary of Defense, Frank Carlucci, testified that "I remain absolutely opposed to the assignment of a law enforcement mission to the Department of Defense. I am even more firmly opposed to any relaxation of the Posse Comitatus restrictions on the use of the military to search, seize and arrest. I have discussed this matter with the President and other senior members of his Cabinet, and I can report that these views are shared throughout this Administration."

France  

France pionnered and than spread the use of the military throughout Europe, becoming widespread. It still exists today, only being used to police rural areas and is called Gendarmerie.

Since Charlie Hebdo shootings military became common place under the Vigipirate plan that allowed the deployment of 3000 soldiers at first up to 11 000 to conduct patrols in French Streets against terrorist attacks. Notably against the designated islamist threat.

Belgium  

In Belgium a plan called Operation Vigilant Guardian since the Charlie Hebdo shooting the mission is planned to end by 2021.

See also 
 Martial law
 Militarization of police - the use of military equipment and tactics by law enforcement officers
 Military aid to the civil power - the use of the armed forces in support of the civil authorities of a state
 Military police - military organizations with law enforcement powers
 Posse comitatus - a group of people mobilized to suppress lawlessness or defend the county

References 

Law enforcement
Military